Cave rescue is a highly specialized field of wilderness rescue in which injured, trapped or lost cave explorers are medically treated and extracted from various cave environments.

Cave rescue borrows elements from firefighting, confined space rescue, rope rescue and mountaineering techniques but has also developed its own special techniques and skills for performing work in conditions that are almost always difficult and demanding. Since cave accidents, on an absolute scale, are a very limited form of incident, and cave rescue is a very specialized skill, normal emergency staff are rarely employed in the underground elements of the rescue. Instead, this is usually undertaken by other experienced cavers who undergo regular training through their organizations and are called up at need.

Cave rescues are slow, deliberate operations that require both a high level of organized teamwork and good communication. The extremes of the cave environment (air temperature, water, vertical depth) dictate every aspect of a cave rescue. Therefore, the rescuers must adapt skills and techniques that are as dynamic as the environment they must operate in.

Overview 

Most international cave rescue units such as the New South Wales Cave Rescue Squad based in Sydney, Australia, are listed with contacts for use in the event of a cave incident.

The world's first cave rescue team, the Cave Rescue Organisation (CRO), was founded in 1935 in Yorkshire, United Kingdom. Like all UK cave rescue groups, it is composed of volunteer cavers and funded entirely by donations. In the UK, regional groups have 'callout lists' containing the details of over 1,000 cavers around the country who can be contacted in case of an emergency. Since 1967, the British Cave Rescue Council (BCRC) has coordinated cave rescue organizations in the United Kingdom.

Organized cave rescue units in the United States are generally city/county funded volunteer squads, composed mainly of seasoned, local cavers.  A pioneer organization in cave rescue in the 1960s was the CRCN (Cave Rescue Communications Network). Although it was not, itself, a rescue unit, it served to organize communications and coordinate contacting experienced cavers in the area to facilitate a rescue. The CRCN nominally operated out of Washington, DC, and covered the mid-Atlantic area. The typical Southeastern US cave rescue team averages between 15 and 20 active members.  Due to the excessive amount of manpower required for a large-scale cave rescue, it is not uncommon for multiple cave rescue units from various regions to assist another in extensive underground operations. Because organized cave rescue teams are quite rare, it is also quite common for local units to cover regions that extend far beyond the area they are nominally responsible for.  The number of cave rescues in North America are relatively small compared to other common wilderness rescues. The average number of reported cave related incidents is usually 40 to 50 per year. In most years, approximately 10 percent of reported accidents result in death.

Historical examples 
 Floyd Collins from Sand Cave, Kentucky, in 1925. Likely the first high-profile cave rescue in history. Collins' desperate situation in the depths of Sand Cave made headlines across America. Over 10,000 spectators flocked to Sand Cave in the week following the news of Floyd's predicament. The National Guard was called in to control the carnival-like atmosphere surrounding the cave. Despite the heroic efforts of volunteers who attempted to dig a parallel shaft to free Collins, he was found dead, buried to his shoulders in debris. One  rock had jammed Collins' foot, preventing his escape. Collins remained trapped in Sand Cave for another two months until a crew of German engineers finished the digging of the shaft and extracted his body.
 Marcel Loubens from Gouffre de la Pierre-Saint-Martin in the French Pyrenees in August 1952. Loubens died from a plunge down the  entrance shaft after a clasp on his harness broke on ascent. Members of Loubens's expedition spent over 24 hours attempting unsuccessfully to haul their friend back to the surface. Despite the efforts of the team doctor, Loubens died 36 hours into his rescue attempt. After his passing the remaining members aborted their recovery attempt. Loubens's body remained in the cave for two more years before cavers returned him to the surface in 1954. The blood transfusion given to Loubens by the team doctor was likely the first subterranean care of its kind.
 Neil Moss in Peak Cavern, England in 1959. Trapped in a narrow tunnel, he was suffocated by carbon dioxide after prolonged efforts to free him. Rescuers were unable to free Moss and the family asked that his body remain in the cave.
 James G. Mitchell from Schroeder's Pants Cave in Manheim, New York in 1965. Mitchell was a 23-year-old chemist whose death made national headlines in February 1965 when he died of hypothermia after becoming stranded on rope in a  pit with a frigid waterfall. Initial efforts to recover Mitchell's body failed. A rescue team was flown from Washington, D.C. on Air Force Two. A subsequent three-day effort to retrieve Mitchell was aborted after repeated failures and a collapse. The cave was abandoned and blasted shut, essentially making the cave a tomb. Mitchell's death made headlines again forty-one years later when a group returned to the cave and successfully recovered his remains.
 In 1967, six cavers were in Mossdale Caverns in North Yorkshire when a flash flood inundated the system. A major rescue attempt was made, but the men were discovered to have perished in the flood. It remains the worst caving disaster in the UK. Their remains were retrieved and buried further in the system four years later.
Eight amateur cavers were found alive by divers after two days trapped in a Kentucky cave after flooding in 1983.
 Emily Davis Mobley from Lechuguilla Cave in New Mexico in 1991. More than 200 people worked over four days to bring her to the surface after her leg was broken. This was the deepest and most remote cave rescue in American history.
A diving instructor was trapped in a cave air pocket in Venezuela in 1992 and later rescued by two American divers.
 Gerald Moni from McBrides Cave in Alabama in 1997. Moni and his group entered McBrides Cave in flood stage attempting a pull-down trip to the cave's lower entrance. A flash flood caused the situation in the cave to become extremely hazardous. While attempting to negotiate a pit being inundated with a high flow of water, Gerald mistakenly grabbed only one of two ropes necessary to descend the pit. The resultant fall to a ledge part way down the drop resulted in a broken femur. A few members of the group managed to negotiate the lower stream passage before it sumped and reached the surface. The others remained with Moni until local rescue agencies could mobilize and attempt a rescue. Rescue teams spent hours waiting for the water levels in the cave to recede enough to attempt an extraction. When teams finally reached Moni, he had been exposed to frigid water for over 12 hours. Rescue teams risked drowning themselves and Moni while traversing the flooded lower cave. 18 hours after his fall Gerald was returned to the surface alive.
Alpazat cave rescue in 2004. Several British military personnel on a recreational expedition were trapped in a cave in Mexico after flooding. They were rescued after nine days underground by Richard Stanton and Jason Mallinson from the British Cave Rescue Organisation.
John Edward Jones in Nutty Putty Cave in Utah in November 2009. Jones, an experienced caver, had become wedged in an unmapped portion of Ed's Push at a 170-degree downward angle with his feet over his head, complicating rescue. After over 24 hours rescuers had been able to move him  upward, and lower down food and water, when a part of the rescue rope system failed, dropping him fully back into the wedge. It was after this that he became too weak to help the rescuers in their efforts and he died shortly thereafter. Following this, it was decided by the family and landowner to leave his body in place and seal the cave permanently.

In February 2014 two Finnish divers died in Jordbrugrotta, Norway. Norwegian authorities summoned an international team of cave divers including Britons Richard Stanton, John Volanthen and Jason Mallinson to recover the bodies. After diving to the site, they deemed the operation too difficult. A diving ban was later given for the cave. However, the involved Finnish divers returned later without official authorisation and recovered the bodies. Their recovery expedition was filmed as the documentary Diving into the Unknown. The diving ban was overturned on 31 March 2014.

Riesending cave rescue in 2014.
Tham Luang cave rescue in 2018. Twelve members of the Moo Pa (Wild Boar) soccer team, aged 11–17, and one coach were trapped in the Tham Luang Nang Non cave in Thailand.  A search was immediately commenced when a ranger of the National Park in Chiang Rai province alerted authorities of the missing boys after seeing their unclaimed belongings at the entrance to the cave. The team was located, alive, on 2 July 2018 by British divers Richard Stanton and John Volanthen; they were assisted later by Jason Mallinson. More than 1,000 people were involved in the rescue operation, including teams from China, Myanmar, Laos, Australia, the UK, and the United States.

In the United States 
Organized Cave Rescue Teams generally utilize the Incident Command System (ICS). Originally devised for wildland fire teams, today the ICS is used by a variety of agencies throughout North America. The ICS can be modified by each agency depending on the nature of their emergencies. Below is an example of a typical cave rescue Incident Command System.

Incident commander
is responsible for all activities, including the development and implementation of strategic decisions during the course of an incident. The IC monitors all aspects of an operation including planning, logistics, communications and information.
Underground manager
usually responsible for implementation of the plan provided by the incident commander. The underground manager assigns and monitors vital tasks including rigging, medical, patient packaging and transport, and communications with the IC on the surface. The underground manager is also usually responsible for the safety of the entire underground team.

Initial response team
a small unit of first responders. The task of the IRT is to travel through the cave to the patient and evaluate the situation with the purpose of reporting back to the appropriate manager. The IRT usually includes the medical personnel so medical intervention can begin early if necessary.
Medical team
varies in size and level of the medics ability from agency to agency. The medical team rarely participates in any other rescue function other than managing patient care.
Communications team
responsible for creating and maintaining communications between the teams in the cave and the Incident Commander. A common means of communications on a cave rescue are military field phones. Military phones are reliable but heavy, and the need for abundant amounts of com-line can make running communications deep into a cave difficult. Another, more advanced type of communication, are low frequency radios, which eliminate the need for thousands of feet of com line in a cave. Low frequency radios can communicate through thousands of feet of solid rock, making them ideal for use deep into caves.
Rigging team
responsible for one or more stations in a cave that require the rigging of ropes or systems to safely transport the patient and emergency personnel through the cave. In a large scale rescue, many rigging teams could be scattered throughout a cave, assigned with multiple tasks.
Litter team
made up of rescue personnel that are not already assigned to rigging, communications, medical or management positions. The responsibility of the Litter Team is the packaging and safe transport of the patient through the cave.
Entrance control
responsible for the logging of all personnel entering and leaving a cave. In some cases the Entrance Control could also be assigned the duty of logging all gear entering and leaving the cave. This is an important task on any cave rescue.

See also 
 List of cave rescue organizations
 Mine rescue

References

External links 

British Cave Rescue Council
National Cave Rescue Commission, US
 NSS Cave Rescue Forum
 U.S. Cavers Forum - Cave Rescue

 
Rescue